Coprinellus dilectus is a species of mushroom in the family Psathyrellaceae. It was first described as Coprinus dilectus by mycologist Elias Magnus Fries in 1838, and later transferred to the genus Coprinellus in 2001.

References

dilectus
Fungi described in 1838
Taxa named by Elias Magnus Fries